Braxton Cook (born March 27, 1991) is an American alto saxophonist and singer-songwriter. He has toured with jazz musicians Christian Scott, Christian McBride, and Marquis Hill, and performed with Jon Batiste, Mac Miller, and Rihanna. In 2017, Fader named Cook a "jazz prodigy," and in 2018, Ebony listed him as one of the "top five jazz artists to watch."

Early life 

Braxton Cook was born on March 27, 1991, in Boston, Massachusetts. After moving several times, his family settled in Silver Spring, Maryland, a suburb of Washington, D.C., where he lived for most of his upbringing.

In high school, Cook was one of 30 students in the United States to be selected for the 2009 Grammy jazz ensemble. He attended Georgetown University, where he studied English. As a freshman, he was named a 2010 YoungArts Finalist.

In 2011, Cook transferred to Juilliard School, where he studied jazz saxophone with Ron Blake and Steve Wilson. In his first year at Juilliard, Cook attended a Donald Harrison concert, where he met Harrison's nephew, jazz trumpet player Christian Scott. Shortly afterward, Cook became a long-term member of Scott's touring band.

Career 

Cook launched his solo career in 2014, self-releasing his debut EP Sketch. He also self-released the full-length album Braxton Cook Meets Butcher Brown in collaboration with American jazz band Butcher Brown in 2015, before signing with independent label Fresh Selects in 2016. Cook has also been featured on several of Christian Scott's studio albums, including Stretch Music (2015), Diaspora (2017), and The Emancipation Procrastination (2017), the last of which was nominated for Best Contemporary Instrumental Album at the 61st Grammy Awards.

In 2018, Cook was featured in a Vox video titled "The most feared song in jazz, explained", which received the Outstanding New Approaches: Arts, Lifestyle and Culture award at the 40th News and Documentary Emmy Awards. For his contributions to the video, Cook received an Emmy Awards certificate.

In 2019, Cook performed alongside Jon Batiste on the soundtrack for Pixar's Soul, which won the Academy Award for Best Original Score.

In May 2020, Cook was featured in a virtual Tiny Desk concert for NPR, which he performed from his home in New Jersey. Without a band to support him due to social distancing, he used loops to support his guitar, vocals, and saxophone. During the concert, Cook performed tracks from various albums including Somewhere in Between (2017) and Fire Sign (2020), as well as his "Hymn (for Trayvon Martin)", which he wrote to explore racism and police brutality. He had previously appeared as a sideman in Tiny Desk concerts featuring Christian Scott in 2015, Tom Misch in 2018, and Phony Ppl in 2019. 

Cook's former Juilliard roommate Jahaan Sweet used a vocal sample from Cook in the production of "Lavender Haze", the opening track on Taylor Swift's 2022 studio album Midnights. Cook was credited as a producer on the track, which he did not hear until the album was released. Cook and Sweet had previously collaborated on the production of the song "Tryna Be" from Giveon's 2022 studio album Give or Take.

In December 2022, Cook announced the release of his fifth full-length studio album Who Are You When No One Is Watching on February 24, 2023, on Nettwerk. BET listed the album as one of the most anticipated releases of 2023.

Discography

Studio albums 

 Braxton Cook Meets Butcher Brown (with Butcher Brown) (2015)
 Somewhere In Between (2017)
 Somewhere In Between: Remixes & Outtakes (2018)
 No Doubt (2018)
 Fire Sign (2020)
 Who Are You When No One Is Watching (2023)

Extended plays 

 Sketch (2014)
 Like You Used To (2018)
 Black Mona Lisa (2022)

References

External links 
 
 
 

1991 births
Living people
American jazz saxophonists
American male saxophonists
Juilliard School alumni
21st-century saxophonists
21st-century American male musicians
Nettwerk Records artists